Edward Astley may refer to:

Sir Edward Astley, 4th Baronet (1729–1802), British MP for Norfolk 
Edward Astley, 22nd Baron Hastings (1912–2007), British peer, soldier and businessman